Newtownbutler railway station was on the Dundalk and Enniskillen Railway in Northern Ireland.

The Dundalk and Enniskillen Railway opened the station on 26 June 1858.

It closed on 1 October 1957.

Routes

References

Disused railway stations in County Fermanagh
Railway stations opened in 1858
Railway stations closed in 1957
Railway stations in Northern Ireland opened in the 19th century